An Introduction to The Moody Blues is a compilation album by the early Moody Blues, led by Denny Laine. It includes songs from The Magnificent Moodies and early singles, as well as "People Gotta Go" which was only included on a rare French-only EP.

Track listing 

 "Go Now" (Larry Banks, Milton Bennett) – 3:11
 "I'll Go Crazy" (James Brown) – 2:09
 "Something You Got" (Chris Kenner) – 2:51
 "Can't Nobody Love You" (Philip Mitchel) – 4:01
 "I Don't Mind" (Brown) – 3:26
 "Stop" (Denny Laine, Mike Pinder) – 2:04
 "It Ain't Necessarily So" (George Gershwin, Ira Gershwin) – 3:19
 "Bye Bye Bird" (Willie Dixon, Sonny Boy Williamson II) – 2:49
 "Steal Your Heart Away" (Robert Parker) – 2:13
 "Lose Your Money (But Don't Lose Your Mind)" (Pinder) – 2:00
 "I Don't Want to Go on Without You" (Bert Berns, Jerry Wexler) – 2:45
 "Time Is on My Side" (Norman Meade) – 3:02
 "From the Bottom of My Heart (I Love You)" (Laine, Pinder) – 3:26
 "Everyday" (Laine, Pinder) – 1:50
 "This Is My House (But Nobody Calls)" (Laine, Pinder) – 2:35
 "Life's Not Life" (Denny Laine, Pinder) – 2:33
 "Boulevard De La Madelaine" (Laine, Pinder) – 2:53
 "People Gotta Go" (Laine, Pinder) – 2:33

Personnel 
Denny Laine - Guitars, piano, keyboards, vocals 
Ray Thomas - Percussion, bass guitar, keyboards, flute, vocals 
Mike Pinder - Keyboards, Piano, Organ, vocals 
Clint Warwick - Bass guitar, vocals 
Graeme Edge - Drums and percussion

Additional personnel
Elaine Caswell - Percussion
Denny Cordell - Co-production
Alex Murray - Co-production
Len Fico Project - Coordinator
Stacie Heyen - Artwork
Greg Russo - Liner notes, research  
Nick Wright - Photography

References 

Albums produced by Denny Cordell
The Moody Blues compilation albums
2006 compilation albums